Jarno Pavén (born May 20, 1993) is a Finnish ice hockey defenceman. He is currently playing with HC TPS in the Finnish SM-liiga.

Pavén made his SM-liiga debut playing with HC TPS during the 2012–13 SM-liiga season.

References

External links

1993 births
Living people
Finnish ice hockey defencemen
HC TPS players
Sportspeople from Turku